Moskovsky Uyezd (Московский уезд) was one of the subdivisions of the Moscow Governorate of the Russian Empire. It was situated in the central part of the governorate and existed until 1929. Its administrative centre was Moscow.

Demographics
At the time of the Russian Empire Census of 1897, Moskovsky Uyezd had a population of 1,203,926. Of these, 95.6% spoke Russian, 1.5% German, 0.8% Polish, 0.4% Yiddish, 0.4% Tatar, 0.4% Ukrainian, 0.2% French, 0.1% Armenian, 0.1% Belarusian, 0.1% English, 0.1% Latvian and 0.1% Czech as their native language.

References

 
Uezds of Moscow Governorate
Moscow Governorate